Dubrovka is a rural locality (a settlement) and the administrative center of Kiselinskoye Rural Settlement, Ternovsky District, Voronezh Oblast, Russia. The population was 599 as of 2010. There are 3 streets.

Geography 
Dubrovka is located 45 km southwest of Ternovka (the district's administrative centre) by road. Kiselnoye is the nearest rural locality.

References 

Rural localities in Ternovsky District